William Matthew Kidd (June 15, 1918 – December 20, 1998) was a United States district judge of the United States District Court for the Northern District of West Virginia and the United States District Court for the Southern District of West Virginia.

Education and career

Born in Burnsville, West Virginia, Kidd was in the United States Navy during World War II, from 1942 to 1945. He received a Bachelor of Laws from West Virginia University College of Law in 1950. He was a member of the West Virginia House of Delegates from 1950 to 1952. He was in private practice in West Virginia from 1952 to 1974. He was the prosecuting attorney of Braxton County, West Virginia from 1962 to 1970. He was a Judge of the 14th Judicial Circuit of West Virginia from 1974 to 1976. He was Chief Judge of the 14th Judicial Circuit from 1976 to 1979.

Federal judicial service

Kidd was nominated by President Jimmy Carter on November 30, 1979, to the United States District Court for the Southern District of West Virginia, to a new seat created by 92 Stat. 1629. He was confirmed by the United States Senate on December 20, 1979, and received his commission on December 21, 1979. On January 14, 1983, Kidd was reassigned by operation of law to the United States District Court for the Northern District of West Virginia. He assumed senior status on January 15, 1990, serving in that status until his death on December 20, 1998, in Morgantown, West Virginia.

References

Sources
 

1918 births
1998 deaths
Military personnel from West Virginia
County prosecuting attorneys in West Virginia
Members of the West Virginia House of Delegates
People from Burnsville, West Virginia
West Virginia circuit court judges
Judges of the United States District Court for the Northern District of West Virginia
Judges of the United States District Court for the Southern District of West Virginia
United States district court judges appointed by Jimmy Carter
20th-century American judges
United States Navy personnel of World War II
West Virginia lawyers
West Virginia University College of Law alumni
20th-century American politicians